Abdihamid Nur (born October 14, 1998) is an American long-distance runner.

Nur set a United States collegiate record in the 5000 meters at the Sound Running Track Meet in May 2022 breaking Henry Rono's 5000 m record from 1978. Nur placed 11th in the 5000 metres Final at the 2022 World Athletics Championships after finishing third at the 2022 USA Outdoor Track and Field Championships. He also won the 3000 metres and 5000 metres at the 2022 NCAA Division I Indoor Track and Field Championships, and is the collegiate record holder in the 5000 meters, with his time of 13:06.32. He won his first national title at the 2022 USA Road 5k Championships on November 5, 2022, in a time of 13:24.

Team USA

USA National Championships

NCAA
Abdihamid Nur is a 2-time NCAA Division 1 champion, 8-time NCAA Division 1 All-American, 7-time Big Sky Conference champion, 10-time All-Big Sky honoree. Abdihamid Nur is a 2022 graduate of Northern Arizona University in Flagstaff, Arizona.

Prep
Nur is a 2016 Arizona Interscholastic Association Cross Country division 1 state champion, and 3-time Arizona Interscholastic Association division 1 state finalist. Nur set personal best times of 5 km 15:30.0, 3200 m 9:27.02, & 1600 m 4:28.34. Abdihamid Nur is a 2017 graduate of North High School in Phoenix, Arizona.

References

External links
 
 Abdihamid Nur at Athletic.net
 
 Abdihamid Nur track and field profile at NAUathletics.com
 Abdihamid Nur cross country profile at NAUathletics.com
 
 
  Abdihamid Nur at Strava

1998 births
Living people
Somalian male long-distance runners
American male long-distance runners
Northern Arizona Lumberjacks men's track and field athletes
Somalian emigrants to the United States
Northern Arizona Lumberjacks men's cross country runners
American sportspeople of African descent
American sportsmen
Sportspeople from Phoenix, Arizona
Track and field athletes from Phoenix, Arizona
United States collegiate record holders in athletics (track and field)
World Athletics Championships athletes for the United States
21st-century African-American sportspeople
African-American male track and field athletes
Northern Arizona University alumni
Sportspeople from Arizona